Brother Island or Brothers Island may refer to any of several islands and island groups around the world, including

In the United States 
 Brother Island, Niagara River, in New York State, near the Horseshoe Falls
 First Brother Island in the Ohio River, West Virginia, near Belmont
 North and South Brother Islands, East River in New York City, between the Bronx and Riker's Island
 North Brother Island, Connecticut and South Brother Island, Connecticut in the Atlantic Ocean off East Lyme, Connecticut
 The Brothers (San Francisco Bay), two islands, East and West, in California
 The Brothers, Humboldt County, two rocks in Humboldt County, California about 6 miles from the town of Petrolia
 Three Brothers Island, California, a tiny island in Humboldt County, California about 5 miles from the town of Petrolia
 Three Brothers (islands), Alaska, a reef near Shakmanof Point, Kodiak Island, Alaska
 Three Brothers islands, in Lake George, near Bolton, New York State

Elsewhere
 Brother Isle in the Shetland archipelago, Scotland, UK
 Great Iyu Island and Little Iyu Island, also known as The Brothers, in the Strait of Malacca
 Middle Brother Islet, Queensland in the Torres Strait off Queensland, Australia
 North Brother Island, India and South Brother Island, India, in the Andaman Archipelago, Indian Ocean
 Pandang Island and Salahnama Island, also known as The Brothers, in the Strait of Malacca
 Rukan Islands also known as Three Brothers (North, Middle and South) at the south entrance of Durian Strait, Indonesia
 Seven Brothers (islands) in the Bab-el-Mandeb strait off Djibouti
 The Brothers (islands), New Zealand in Cook Strait
 The Brothers (islands), Hong Kong, East and West, in the mouth of the Pearl River
 The Brothers, Egypt in the Red Sea
 The Brothers, Greece in the Aegean Sea
 Samhah and Darsah, an island pair in the Socotra archipelago, off the Horn of Africa, known as "The Brothers" (Arabic: Al-Ikhwān)
 Three Brothers (islands), Chagos (North, Middle and South) in the Chagos Archipelago, Indian Ocean
 Three Brothers, Lake Baikal, at Cape Sagan Khushun, near Olkhon, Lake Baikal, Russia
 Three Brothers, Okhotsk Sea, three large rocks off Veselaya Bay, near the town of Magadan, Kamchatka, Russia
 Three Brothers or Tri Brata, three tall rocks in the Avacha Bay of Kamchatka, Russia

See also
 Sister Island (disambiguation)
 Isabel Island (Philippines) and Carlota Island in the Philippines, formerly comprising the barrio of Isla de los Hermanos ("Brothers Island")  
 Eadie Island, Aspland Island, and O'Brien Island in the South Shetland archipelago off Antarctica, called Ostrova Tri Brata ("Three Brothers Islands") by their Russian discoverer
 Riddarholmen, an islet in central Stockholm, sometimes called Gråbrödraholm ("Grey Brothers Islet") between the 13th and 17th centuries